It Tiz Well (foaled  April 30, 2014 ) is an American Thoroughbred racehorse and the winner of the 2017 Cotillion Handicap.

Career

It Tiz Well's first race was on October 28, 2016, at Santa Anita, where she came in third. She picked up her first win on December 18, 2016, in her second race.

She competed in her first graded race, the Grade-2 Santa Ynez Stakes, on January 8, 2017, where he came in second place. He picked up a victory the next month in a claiming race at Santa Anita on February 3, 2017.

On March 11, 2017, she picked up her first stakes win when he won the 2017 Honeybee Stakes.

She placed in third at the April 8th, 2017 Santa Anita Oaks and in fourth at the June 17th, 2017 Summertime Oaks.

On July 8, 2017, she picked up a win at the Grade-3 Delaware Oaks, and followed it up with a second-place finish at the August 19th, 2017 Alabama Stakes.

His final race was on September 23, 2017, when she captured the 2017 Cotillion Handicap. She had an ankle bone chip injury during training on December 30, 2017, and was retired.

Pedigree

References

2014 racehorse births